The  was a trend in film criticism and filmmaking in 1910s and early 1920s, Japan that advocated what were considered more modern and cinematic modes of filmmaking.

Critics in such magazines as Kinema Record and Kinema Junpo complained that existing Japanese cinema was overly theatrical. They said it presented scenes from kabuki and shinpa theater as is, with little cinematic manipulation and without a screenplay written with cinema in mind. Women were even played by onnagata. Filmmakers were charged with shooting films with long takes and leaving the storytelling to the benshi in the theater instead of using devices such as close-ups and analytical editing to visually narrate a scene. The novelist Jun'ichiro Tanizaki was an important supporter of the movement. Critics such as Norimasa Kaeriyama eventually became filmmakers to put their ideas of what cinema is into practice, with Kaeriyama directing The Glow of Life at the Tenkatsu Studio in 1918. This is often considered the first "pure film," but filmmakers such as Eizō Tanaka, influenced by shingeki theater, also made their own innovations in the late 1910s at studios like Nikkatsu. The move towards "pure film" was aided by the appearance of new reformist studios such as Shochiku and Taikatsu around 1920. By the mid-1920s, Japanese cinema exhibited more of the cinematic techniques pure film advocates called for, and onnagata were replaced by actresses. The movement profoundly influenced the way films would be made and thought about for decades to come, but it was not a complete success: benshi would remain an integral part of the Japanese film experience into the 1930s.

References

Bibliography
 
 
 
  Available online at the Center for Japanese Studies, University of Michigan

Movements in cinema
History of film of Japan